The God Help Me Pass, or Lekhalong-la-Molimo-Nthuse in seSotho, is a mountain pass (elev. 2318 m) in western Lesotho. It is the second mountain pass on the A3 road going into the central highlands. The road ascends steeply from the village of Setibing, and near the summit is the Basotho Pony Trekking Centre, which offers a variety of trekking expeditions. The Makhaleng River flows close by Setibing, and its valley forms the western approach to the pass. The higher Blue Mountain Pass (2641 m), Lekhalong-la-Thaba-Putsoa, is a few kilometres further east, and the first mountain pass, Bushman's Pass, Lekhalong-la-Baroa, (2266 m) is about 10 km to the west, rising from the village of Nazareth.

God Help Me Pass

References
Fitzpatrick, M., Blond, B., Pitcher, G., Richmond, S., and Warren, M. (2004) South Africa, Lesotho and Swaziland. Footscray, VIC: Lonely Planet.

Mountain passes of Lesotho
Makhaleng River